James Meech (16 December 1884 – 31 October 1955) was an Australian cricketer. He played two first-class matches for Tasmania between 1906 and 1910.

See also
 List of Tasmanian representative cricketers

References

External links
 

1884 births
1955 deaths
Australian cricketers
Tasmania cricketers
Cricketers from Hobart